Victoria  is a suburb of Rotorua in the Bay of Plenty Region of New Zealand's North Island.

Demographics

Victoria had a population of 2,094 at the 2018 New Zealand census, an increase of 342 people (19.5%) since the 2013 census, and an increase of 456 people (27.8%) since the 2006 census. There were 894 households, comprising 1,032 males and 1,062 females, giving a sex ratio of 0.97 males per female. The median age was 32.9 years (compared with 37.4 years nationally), with 312 people (14.9%) aged under 15 years, 573 (27.4%) aged 15 to 29, 936 (44.7%) aged 30 to 64, and 273 (13.0%) aged 65 or older.

Ethnicities were 37.4% European/Pākehā, 26.6% Māori, 5.4% Pacific peoples, 41.1% Asian, and 1.7% other ethnicities. People may identify with more than one ethnicity.

The percentage of people born overseas was 45.1, compared with 27.1% nationally.

Although some people chose not to answer the census's question about religious affiliation, 30.1% had no religion, 38.7% were Christian, 2.7% had Māori religious beliefs, 10.6% were Hindu, 1.9% were Muslim, 2.3% were Buddhist and 9.2% had other religions.

Of those at least 15 years old, 465 (26.1%) people had a bachelor's or higher degree, and 279 (15.7%) people had no formal qualifications. The median income was $22,800, compared with $31,800 nationally. 90 people (5.1%) earned over $70,000 compared to 17.2% nationally. The employment status of those at least 15 was that 843 (47.3%) people were employed full-time, 285 (16.0%) were part-time, and 123 (6.9%) were unemployed.

Education

Notable locations
Robertson House, 70 Pererika Street, 1905 bay villa, family home of Edwin Robertson, who was one of the largest private employers in Rotorua at the time.

References

Suburbs of Rotorua
Populated places in the Bay of Plenty Region